The Kura gudgeon (Romanogobio persus) is a species of cyprinid fish found in the Kura and Aras basins in Europe and Asia.

References

Romanogobio
Fish described in 1899
Taxa named by Albert Günther